Fjordia lineata is a species of sea slug, an aeolid nudibranch, a marine heterobranch mollusc in the family Flabellinidae.

Description
Fjordia lineata are commonly 20-30mm (2-3 cm) in length and are seen in a variety of colours, translucent white with either red, red-brown, yellow, or orange colouring of the digestive gland within the cerata.

Diet
This species feeds on hydroids such as Tubularia indivisa.

Distribution 
Fjordia lineata can be found throughout the British Isles, and can also be found south as far as the Mediterranean Sea and north to Norway.

References

Flabellinidae
Gastropods described in 1846